Attitude is the second and final studio album by New Zealand-born Australian pop singer Collette. Attitude was released in April 1991 and peaked at No. 107 in Australia.

Track listing
CD/Cassette/Vinyl (467674.2/4/1)
 "Attitude" – 3:21
 "Upside Down" – 3:28
 "This Will Be (Everlasting Love)" – 3:38
 "Every Beat of My Heart" – 3:46
 "Get With It" – 4:01
 "Rhythm of Life" – 4:02
 "Who Do You Think You Are" – 3:48
 "Don't Lead Me On" – 3:51
 "Give It Up"	– 3:36
 "Who Would Ever Believe"	– 3:13
 "No Turning Back" – 2:44

Charts

References

1991 albums
CBS Records albums
Collette Roberts albums